Vernon Eugene Curtis (May 24, 1920 – June 24, 1992), nicknamed "Turk", was an American professional baseball pitcher. A right-hander, he appeared in 11 games over parts of three seasons in Major League Baseball for the Washington Senators (– and ). Curtis served in the United States Navy in 1945, the final year of World War II.

He began his pro baseball career in 1942, and was called to the Senators in September 1943 for his first MLB trial. In his 11 games with Washington, spread over three seasons, he posted a 0–1 record and a 5.70 earned run average; he allowed 30 hits and 19 bases on balls in 30 full innings pitched, with ten strikeouts. In his only starting pitcher assignment, on September 24, 1944, he pitched creditably against his "hometown" Chicago White Sox at Comiskey Park, permitting only five hits and two earned runs in seven innings pitched. But Washington was shut out by Eddie Lopat and fell 2–0. The loss was Curtis' only big-league decision. He left baseball after the 1948 minor-league season.

References

External links

1920 births
1992 deaths
Atlanta Crackers players
Baseball players from Illinois
Buffalo Bisons (minor league) players
Chattanooga Lookouts players
Greenville Spinners players
Hopkinsville Hoppers players
Major League Baseball pitchers
Minneapolis Millers (baseball) players
People from Cairo, Illinois
United States Navy personnel of World War II
United States Navy sailors
Washington Senators (1901–1960) players
Waycross Bears players